Soorya Gayathri (സൂര്യ ഗായത്രി) is a 1992 Indian Malayalam-language drama film directed by P. Anil, written by John Paul, produced by M. Mani, and starring Mohanlal in the lead role. The songs were composed by Raveendran. The film is a revenge story, of a father who goes after the murderers of his son.

Plot

Married at 26 and widowed at 29, Dr. Balasubrahmaniam lives with his teenage son. He tells him about his life, how he was with his wife and how he got his son and how he lost his wife due to pneumonia. One day, he heard that his son was First Rank in his +2 standard. He had a party. The Doctor asked what he wanted to study. The son does not want to follow his father into medicine and joins an engineering college. He accidentally teases some unruly seniors in his college and gets into trouble. He is pushed from a tall building and got severely hurt in his head. He died a few days later and the Doctor hears this news. The upset father tries to get revenge on his son's killers.

Cast
Mohanlal as Dr. Balasubrahmaniam  
Urvashi as  Rugmini 
Parvathy as Dr. Sreelakshmi 
Nedumudi Venu as  Manisankar Iyer 
Anu Anand as Raju Viswam
Major Sundarrajan as Viswesara Iyyer
Sukumari as  Paatti 
Bahadoor as  Kunjali 
Kollam Thulasi as College Principal 
Janardhanan as Babu Karunakaran 
Thodupuzha Vasanthi as Nurse    
Jose Pellissery as  Kuriakose 
Jagannathan as Ramanathan

Soundtrack
The film has songs composed by Raveendran, with lyrics by O. N. V. Kurup.

References

External links
 

1990s Malayalam-language films
1992 films
1990s musical films
Films about school violence
Films scored by Raveendran